"Till It Hurts" is a song by Dutch electronic trio Yellow Claw, featuring vocals performed by Dutch singer Ayden (stage name of Sanne Veerbeek). It was released digitally as a single in November 2014 through Spinnin' Records.

"Till It Hurts" follows up on the success of their 2013 hit "Shotgun", peaking at number five in the Netherlands.

Charts

Weekly charts

Year-end charts

References 

2014 songs
2014 singles
Yellow Claw (DJs) songs
Spinnin' Records singles